The Lucerne S-Bahn is an S-Bahn-style commuter rail network focusing on Lucerne, Switzerland.

Opened on 12 December 2004, the network forms part of the Central Switzerland S-Bahn project, which also includes the Zug Stadtbahn.

Current map

Lines
, the network consisted of the following lines:

See also

Trolleybuses in Lucerne

References

External links

 BLS – official site 

S-Bahn in Switzerland
S-Bahn
2004 establishments in Switzerland